Leif Eriksson (born 1946) is a Swedish cabinetmaker who, along with fiddler Per Gudmundson, developed the modern revival of the Swedish bagpipe in the 1980s. Eriksson initially only made pipes to order, but his reputation increased when he was asked to produce pipes for the Dalarnas museum .

References

External links

Bagpipe makers
Swedish musical instrument makers
1946 births
Living people